There are Latin American economic crises:
Latin American debt crisis of the 1970s and 1980s
La Década Perdida - the Lost Decade for Mexico
Economic history of Mexico#1982 crisis and recovery
Great Depression in Latin America - the effects of the Great Depression of the 1930s on Latin America
Venezuelan banking crisis of 1994
2007–10 recession in South America
Argentine economic crisis (1999–2002)
Crisis in Venezuela

International economics lists
Economic crises